Tarek Hadj Adlane (born December 11, 1965) is a retired Algerian football player who played as a striker. Hadj Adlane played in his career with USM Alger and JS Kabylie as well as in Saudi Arabia with Al-Wehda.

Club career

International career
On October 29, 1988 Tarek Hadj Adlane played for the first time against Angola in friendly match ended in a 1–1 draw. Hadj Adlane scored three goals with the national team all are in friendly matches, the first was against Mali in a match that ended with a 7–0 victory. and then scored against Finland and Tunisia, His last match with the national team was on July 22, 1995 against Tunisia which ended in a 2–1 victory.

Career statistics

Club

International

International goals
Scores and results list Algeria's goal tally first.

Honours

Club
 USM Alger
 Algerian Championnat National (1): 2001–02
 Algerian Cup (4): 1988, 1997, 1999, 2001

 JS Kabylie
 Algerian Championnat National (1): 1994–95
 Algerian Super Cup (1): 1992
 Algerian Cup (2): 1992, 1994
 African Cup Winners Cup (1): 1995

Individual
 Algerian Ligue Professionnelle 1 top scorer: 1992–93, 1993–94

References

External links

1965 births
Living people
Algerian footballers
Algeria international footballers
JS Kabylie players
USM Alger players
Al-Wehda Club (Mecca) players
Saudi Professional League players
Algerian expatriate footballers
Expatriate footballers in Saudi Arabia
Algerian expatriate sportspeople in Saudi Arabia
Association football forwards
21st-century Algerian people